The following article is about contemporary followers of Hinduism in Greece.  For information about the importance of Hinduism in Hellenistic Greece, see the article Indo-Greeks. For archeological evidence of Greek-born Hindus in the Hellenistic era, see Heliodorus pillar.

Hinduism in Greece has a small following. On March 1, 2006, the Greek government passed a law allowing cremation. This law was welcomed by the Indian community in Athens. In 2012, there were about 20,000 Hindus in Greece.

Indians in Greece
There is a tiny Hindu community in Athens. There are 25 PIOs and 12 NRIs in the city. There are many more Indian migrant workers in Athens, also in the whole of Greece, many of them work as domestic workers or chauffeurs for rich families.

Indian organisations in Greece
Greek Indian Cultural and Welfare Association and Indo-Greek Business Foundation.
United Native Indian Community of Greece (UNICOG). There is a small mandir in Dilesi, near Tanagra.

Hindu organisations
ISKCON, Satyananda Yoga, Sahaja Yoga, Brahma Kumari and Sathya Sai Baba organizations exists in Greece.

Sahaja Yoga
Sahaja yoga was founded by Shri Mataji Nirmala Devi in 1970. "Saha" means "with" and "ja" means born, born with you and "yoga" is the union with the all-pervading power of Divine love. Another meaning of Sahaja is spontaneous. So, Sahaja yoga means spontaneous union with the Divine. It is a unique method of meditation by which one can achieve mental, emotional, physical, and spiritual wellbeing.

In Sahaja yoga, self-realization is the key and a person gains his or her self-realization, when the kundalini energy within us is awakened. To get your self-realization and to participate in online meditation courses, visit http://www.sahajayoga.gr/en/
To get your self-realization in any of the Indian languages, visit https://www.sahajayoga.org.in/

Satyananda Yoga
Yoga is gaining popularity in Greece especially Satyananda Yoga and Sahaja Yoga. Satyananda Yoga was founded by Swami Satyananda. Swami Satyananda assigned Swami Sivamurti to carry the message of yoga to Greece. Through his inspiration and guidance, in 1978 Swami Sivamurti instituted Satyanandashram Hellas (beginning at Kalamata and then expanding to Athens, Thessaloniki and other parts of the Greek mainland and islands). The present Ashram of Satyanandashram Hellas was established in 1984 outside the town of Paiania and inaugurated by Swami Satyananda the following year. 
In 1984 and 1985 Swami Satyananda visited Greece and inspired countless spirants with the ancient message, 'Know Thyself'. During these tours, he expounded the wisdom of yoga and tantra in a series of sublime and profound teachings on spiritual life, and revealed yoga as the priceless heritage of humanility.

Garuda Hellas  publishing house was established in 2007 and is based in Thessaloniki, Greece. Small in size, Garuda Hellas offers clear educational and a personalized support through his books for each yoga student. It imports yoga books in English, primarily from the Bihar School of Yoga, India. Garuda Hellas also translates and publishes yoga books in Greek, so that the wisdom of yoga can be objectively and scientifically presented to all Greek speaking people.

ISKCON
ISKCON (acronym for the International Society for Krishna Consciousness) has few devotees in Greece. ISKCON established a branch in Athens, Greece. ISKCON Greece is located at 60 Kolokotroni Street, in Athens Greece (105 60). ISKCON Greece has the status of a church, a "house of prayer" and is recognized as such from the Greek Ministry of Religion.

References

External links
 Greece to Allow cremation
 Controversy over Durga in Greece
 Sathya Sai Organisation in Greece
 Satyananda Yoga in Greece
 Sahaja Yoga in Greece
 ISKCON Centre in Europe
 Rupanuga Vedic College in Athens
 Brahma Kumaris in Greece

Greece–India relations
Greece
Greece
Hinduism